Department of Mental Health may refer to

Alabama Department of Mental Health
Los Angeles County Department of Mental Health
Massachusetts Department of Mental Health
Mississippi Department of Mental Health
Guam Department of Mental Health and Substance Abuse
Oklahoma Department of Mental Health and Substance Abuse Services
Virginia Department of Mental Health, Mental Retardation, and Substance Abuse